Horns Corners is an unincorporated community in the Town of Cedarburg, Ozaukee County, Wisconsin, United States.

History
A post office called Horn's Corners was established in 1857, and remained in operation until 1910. The community was named for Frederick W. Horn, who owned land in the area.

Notes

Unincorporated communities in Ozaukee County, Wisconsin
Unincorporated communities in Wisconsin